The three districts of the Chittagong Hill Tracts (Southeast Bangladesh), Bandarban, Rangamati and Khagrachari, still have monarchs. In 1860, the British government divided the Chittagong Hill Tracts into three circles, Chakma, Bomang and Mong. Bomang Circle is located in Bandarban, Chakma Circle in Rangamati and Mong Circle in Khagrachari. The monarchs of these three districts are known as three kings. For hundreds of years, the people of the Chittagong Hill Tracts have been following the orders of the three kings. But the kings do not have much power now. Their activities are limited to issuing permanent resident certificates, tax collection, some social justice, arbitration meetings. But the three kings have a long history.

Monarchs 
According to the rules of the Chakma and Mong circles, the eldest son of the royal family is appointed as the king in the lineage, but in the Bomang circle of Bandarban, the eldest of the dynasty becomes the king. Barrister Devashish Roy is currently serving as the Chakma Raja in Rangamati, KS Prue Chowdhury is the Raja of Bomang Circle in Bandarban and Saching Prue Chowdhury is the Mong Raja in Khagrachari. It is learned that Devashish Roy officially took over as the king on November 25, 1977, in Rangamati. He is the 51st king of Chakma circle. On April 24, 2013, the government appointed U Cha Prue as the successor after the death of the 16th Bomang King K S Prue Chowdhury. He has been in charge since then. Prior to that, he served as a civil engineer in various organizations. Saching Prue, the current king of the Mong Circle in Khagrachari. When Raja Paihla Prue Chowdhury died in a recent road accident, he was appointed as the new king. He is the ninth king of the Mong circle.

Proceedings 
There are 178 mouzas in Chakma circle, 97 in Bomang circle and 100 in Mong circle. The headmen act as the head of each mouza. In each neighborhood there is a trader as a representative of the king. The king appoints headmen and traders. And the headmen and traders collect taxes as well as maintain law and order in the concerned areas. Every year during the winter, three kings organize Rajpunyah. At this time, the tenants pay taxes for their land. A royal ceremony is organized on this occasion. However, in Rangamati and Khagrachari, Rajpunyah is not so prevalent.

However, in Bandarban there is a fixed time for Rajpunyah every year. 42 percent of the tax collected in Rajpunya is deposited in the treasury of the king, 37 percent in the treasury of the headman and 21 percent in the treasury of the government. It is known that the kings were very powerful during the British Raj. However, the rights of the kings have been curtailed since the Pakistan period. Since independence, their power has been declining. At present the kings get only 5 thousand taka honorarium. The Headman gets 500 and the trader 300 taka. There is anger among the king, headman and traders about this.

References 

Monarchies of Asia
Chittagong District